Everybody Dance is a 1936 British musical film directed by Charles Reisner and starring Cicely Courtneidge, Ernest Truex, Percy Parsons and Alma Taylor. The film's sets were designed by Alex Vetchinsky. It was made at Islington Studios.

Sidney Gilliat called it "dreadful".

Plot
When a successful nightclub singer (Cicely Courtneidge) finds herself guardian to her late sisters children, she ditches her singing career and takes the kids to live on a farm. Her manager is less than happy and resorts to legal means to try and stop her.

Cast
 Cicely Courtneidge as Katharine 'Lady Kate' Levering
 Ernest Truex as Wilbur Spurgeon
 Percy Parsons as Josiah Spurgeon
 Alma Taylor as Rosemary Spurgeon
 Chuck Reisner Jr. as Tony Spurgeon
 Billie De la Volta as Shirley Spurgeon
 Kathleen Harrison as Lucy
 Bruce Winston as Pierre
 C. Denier Warren as Dan Fleming
 Peter Gawthorne as Sir Rowland Morton
 Helen Haye as Lady Morton
 Janet Johnson as Lilian Morton
 Joan Ponsford as Dorothy Morton

References

Bibliography
 Low, Rachael. Filmmaking in 1930s Britain. George Allen & Unwin, 1985.
 Wood, Linda. British Films, 1927-1939. British Film Institute, 1986.

External links

1936 films
British musical films
1936 musical films
Gainsborough Pictures films
Islington Studios films
Films directed by Charles Reisner
British black-and-white films
Films set in London
1930s English-language films
1930s British films